The Falcon Strikes Back  ( The Falcon Comes Back) is a 1943 American crime film directed by Edward Dmytryk and stars Tom Conway as the title character, the amateur sleuth, the Falcon. Supporting roles are filled by Harriet Hilliard, Jane Randolph, Edgar Kennedy, with Cliff Edwards filling in for Allen Jenkins as the Falcon's sidekick, "Goldie" Locke. It is the fifth film in the Falcon series and the second for Conway, reprising the role that his brother, George Sanders had initiated.

Plot
Amateur sleuth Tom Lawrence (Tom Conway) known as "The Falcon," is approached by Mia Bruger (Rita Corday) to help in finding her brother, who had gone missing. When Tom goes to a cocktail bar, he is attacked and knocked unconscious. When he revives, he finds himself in his car on a country road. A motorcycle police officer stops him and arrests him, because Police Inspector Timothy Donovan (Cliff Clark) has put out an "all-points" bulletin for his arrest in the case of a murdered bank official and the theft of $250,000 in war bonds.

Although the Falcon has an alibi with his fiancée, reporter Marcia Brooks (Jane Randolph) and assistant, "Goldie" Locke (Cliff Edwards) supporting him, Donovan is skeptical and attempts to incarcerate Tom, who makes his escape. Returning to the bar, it is now the headquarters of a woman's knitting society, run by  Geraldine Lipton (Wynne Gibson). When the trio of sleuths head off to Lipton's resort hotel, they find a number of suspicious individuals, hotel manager Gwynne Gregory (Harriet Hilliard), former criminal Rickey Davis (Erford Gage), a nurse to invalid Bruno Steffen (André Charlot) and Mia.

When Tom approaches Mia, she pretends that she doesn't know him and dives into the pool but as she hits the water, she is killed by a gunshot. Looking for the killer, Tom runs into puppeteer Smiley Dugan (Edgar Kennedy), who alerts Donovan that the Falcon is at the hotel. Picking up a cigarette case that might be a clue to the murderer, Tom has to work quickly before Donovan arrives.

Marcia reports that the fingerprints on the cigarette case belong to a notorious thief known as "the Duchess". Tom phones his houseboy, Jerry (Richard Loo), telling him to pose as the Chinese Trade Commissioner wanting to buy war bonds. After Steffen confides to Jerry that he plans to buy war bonds from Gwynne, Tom exposes Mrs. Lipton as the Duchess, and accuses her of stealing the bonds, but Donovan, with a warrant for murder, arrests Tom, Marcia, Goldie and Jerry instead.

Finding a way to escape once again, Tom returns to the hotel, and confronts Mrs. Lipton, who was being blackmailed by Rickey into selling the war bonds. When Rickey is killed, a terrified Gwynne confesses that she was involved because Rickey was her husband. When he is trapped in an elevator with Gwynne, Tom realizes that the killer is still in the hotel. Finding a way out, Tom rushes to Mrs. Lipton's room to find the puppeteer threatening the hotel owner. When Tom tries to apprehend him, Dugan falls to his death. Donovan, now convinced in Tom's innocence, arrives to arrest Mrs. Lipton for the theft of the war bonds.

Cast

 Tom Conway as Tom Lawrence
 Harriet Hilliard as Gwynne Gregory
 Jane Randolph as Marcia Brooks
 Edgar Kennedy as Smiley Dugan
 Cliff Edwards as Goldie Locke
 Rita Corday as Mia Bruger
 Erford Gage as Rickey Davis
 Wynne Gibson as Geraldine H. Lipton
 André Charlot as Bruno Steffen (credited as Andre Charlot)
 Richard Loo as Jerry
 Cliff Clark as Police Inspector Timothy Donovan
 Edward Gargan as Detective Bates (credited as Ed Gargan)
 Byron Foulger as Hotel clerk
 Patti Brill as Girl bellhop
 Margaret Landry as Girl bellhop
 Margie Stewart as Girl bellhop
 Jean Brooks as Spanish girl
 Olin Howland as Sheriff (credited as Olin Howlin)
 Perc Launders as Bartender
 Eddie Dunn as Grimes
 Charles Russell as Bank messenger
 Frank O'Connor as Bank guard
 Ralph Dunn as Motorcycle policeman
 Frank Faylen as Hobo
 Jack Norton as Hobo
 George Lloyd as Brannigan
 Mary Stuart as Usherette
 Lorna Dunn as Taxi driver

Production
With the working title of "The Falcon Comes Back", principal photography took place from January 19 till early-February 1943.

Reception
In his review of The Falcon Strikes Back, Theodore Strauss wrote, in The New York Times, "There is something highly irregular about "The Falcon Strikes Back," now at the Palace, and we don't mean murder. Item: The role of the Falcon is no longer played by George Sanders, but by his brother, Tom Conway, who looks like Sanders, sounds like Sanders, but is less of an actor—the result is a sort of double exposure, slightly out of focus. Item: Edgar Kennedy after all these years of two-reel comedy madness, turns out to be a dangerous maniac after all, which is like discovering that Donald Duck really belongs in the ward for violent cases. Aside from these two troublesome matters, "The Falcon Strikes Back" is hardly worth bothering about. The Falcon rounds up a gang of bond thieves amid the standard quota of murder and mayhem, but the lack of suspense is terrific."

References

Notes

Bibliography

 Jewell, Richard B. Slow Fade to Black: The Decline of RKO Radio Pictures. Berkeley, California: University of California Press, 2016. .
 Jewell, Richard and Vernon Harbin. The RKO Story. New Rochelle, New York: Arlington House, 1982. .

External links
 
 
 
 

1943 films
1943 crime films
American crime films
American black-and-white films
American detective films
American sequel films
Films scored by Roy Webb
Films directed by Edward Dmytryk
RKO Pictures films
The Falcon (film character) films
1940s English-language films
1940s American films